Werner Balte (17 February 1948 – 	17 March 2007) was a German football midfielder.

Career
He won the German Goal of the Month for June 1971.

Statistics

1 1969–70 and 1970–71 include the Fußball-Regionalliga promotion playoffs.

References

External links
 

1948 births
2007 deaths
German footballers
Bundesliga players
VfL Bochum players
Association football midfielders